Tibouchina llanorum is a species of flowering plant in the family Melastomataceae, native to Bolivia, north Brazil, Colombia and Venezuela. It was first described by John Julius Wurdack in 1964.

References

llanorum
Flora of Bolivia
Flora of North Brazil
Flora of Colombia
Flora of Venezuela
Plants described in 1964